Monica Pedersen is a designer on the show "Designed to Sell". She is the host of HGTV's 2009 Dream Home tour television special.

Monica frequently appears on HGTV's Bang for Your Buck to critique designs made for home renovations.

She hosted the 2011 HGTV Dream Home.

References

External links
HGTV profile

Year of birth missing (living people)
Living people
American television personalities
American women television personalities
American interior designers
American women interior designers
People from Wood Dale, Illinois
21st-century American women